Molly Van Nostrand (born March 12, 1965) is a retired American professional tennis player.

Career
Van Nostrand turned professional in 1983. Her best Grand Slam performance was reaching the quarterfinals at Wimbledon in 1985. She had career wins over Natasha Zvereva, Helena Suková, Manuela Maleeva, Wendy Turnbull, and Dianne Fromholtz. She reached a career-high ranking of World No. 37 in 1986. She retired in 1989. She is the younger sister of the late John Van Nostrand, who was also a professional tennis player.

WTA Tour finals

Singles: 1 (0–1)

Doubles: 1 (0–1)

Grand Slam singles tournament timeline

References

External links

1965 births
Living people
American female tennis players
People from West Islip, New York
Sportspeople from Suffolk County, New York
Tennis people from New York (state)
21st-century American women